She is a 1954 West German romantic comedy film directed by Rolf Thiele and starring Marina Vlady, Walter Giller, and  Nadja Tiller.

The film's sets were designed by the art director Walter Haag. It was made at Göttingen Studios and on location in several sites including Paris.

Plot
In Paris a Hungarian illustrator becomes engaged to Céline, the seventeen-year-old daughter of the owner of the newspaper at which he works. They have to wait four years until she is legally able to marry him. In the meantime he seems to have become attracted to a young Italian woman.

Cast

References

External links

1954 romantic comedy films
German romantic comedy films
West German films
Films directed by Rolf Thiele
Films set in Paris
Films shot in Paris
Films based on Hungarian novels
German black-and-white films
1950s German-language films
1950s German films
Films shot at Göttingen Studios